Porcelain is the second album by English singer-songwriter Julia Fordham, released in 1989. It became Fordham's highest-charting album in both the UK Albums Chart and US Billboard 200, peaking at numbers 13 and 74 respectively.

The track "Lock and Key" was released as lead single and reached number 80 in the UK Singles Chart. Follow up UK singles released were "Genius" (which was also released as an extended 12" single) and the double A-side "Girlfriend" / "Manhattan Skyline". "Manhattan Skyline" was released as a US single and reached #40 on the Adult Contemporary chart.

Track listing
All tracks written by Julia Fordham.	
"Lock and Key"
"Porcelain"
"Girlfriend"
"For You Only for You"
"Genius"
"Did I Happen to Mention?"
"Towerblock"
"Island"
"Your Lovely Face"
"China Blue"
"Prince of Peace"

Note
 Track 10 is on the UK & Europe CD version only; track 11 is on the UK & Europe vinyl and CD versions only. US versions include "Manhattan Skyline" as track 6.

Personnel
Adapted from AllMusic.

Arran Ahmun – drums
Tom Baker – mastering
Miles Bould – percussion
Dave Cliff – guitar
Graham Dickson	– engineer
Julia Fordham – arranger, guitar, primary artist, producer, vocal arrangement, background vocals
David Green – double bass
Manu Katché – drums, guest artist
Kim Knott – photography
Diane B.J. Koné – assistant engineer
Ingmar Koné – assistant engineer
Kevin Maloney – engineer, producer
Dominic Miller – bass, drum programming, engineer, guitar, keyboards, programming
Grant Mitchell – arranger, guitar, keyboards, piano, producer, string arrangements
Hugh Padgham – engineer, mixing, producer
Bill Padley – engineer
Pino Palladino – bass, guest artist
Kate St. John – oboe
Alan Stone – assistant engineer, mixing assistant
Alan Thomson – bass
Cristina Viera	– translation
Helen Woodward	– assistant engineer
Taj Wyzgowski – guitar

Charts and certifications

Weekly charts

Certifications

References

External links
Porcelain at Discogs

1989 albums
Virgin Records albums
Julia Fordham albums
Albums produced by Hugh Padgham
Albums recorded at Studio Miraval